James Keith may refer to:

 James Francis Edward Keith (1696–1758), Scottish soldier and Prussian field marshal
 James Keith, Baron Keith of Avonholm (1886–1964), Scottish Senator of the College of Justice, and law lord
 James Keith (Virginia judge) (1839–1918), president of the state of Virginia's Supreme Court of Appeals from 1895 to 1916
 Reverend James Keith, Massachusetts colonial minister who served from 1664 to 1719 at what is now called Reverend James Keith Parsonage
 Jim Keith (1949–1999), American author